Sanxiang (in Cantonese Samheung, in the language itself Sahiu) is a variety of Eastern Min Chinese mostly spoken in Sanxiang in Zhongshan in the Pearl River Delta of Guangdong, China.
Despite its close proximity, Sanxiang is not very closely related to the surrounding dialects in the region, which belong to the Yue group, and thus forms a "dialect island" of Min speakers. It is one of three enclaves of Min in Zhongshan, the others being Longdu and Nanlang.

References 

Guangdong
Southern Min